Abani Bari Achho is a poem by Shakti Chattopadhyay. It is considered one of the iconic poems of modern Bengali poetry. It is included in his seminal early collection ধর্মেও আছো জিরাফেও আছো Dhôrmeo achho jirafeo achho (You are into religion, You are into giraffes), published in 1965.

References

Bengali culture
Bengali poetry
Indian poems
1965 poems